North Walney Nature Reserve is a national nature reserve on Walney Island, England.  The reserve, which has an area of 646.5 ha, is notable as a habitat of natterjack toads. It is one of the sites in the Duddon Estuary which support one-fifth of the national population of the rare amphibian.

Habitats
The geology of the island is the product of erosion and reworking of glacial sediments, sometimes interpreted as an esker. The reserve protects a sand dune system along with other habitats such as salt marsh and intertidal mudflats.

Protection
North Walney was formerly a separate Site of Special Scientific Interest, but it has been amalgamated with other SSSIs to form the Duddon Estuary Site of Special Scientific Interest.  The Duddon Estuary was designated a Special Protection Area under the Birds Directive, and is now merged with Morecambe Bay.

See also
There is a separate nature reserve at South Walney, managed by the Cumbria Wildlife Trust, notable for its gulls and seals.

References

North Walney NNR, Natural England

Dunes of England
National nature reserves in England
Nature reserves in Cumbria
Sites of Special Scientific Interest in Cumbria
Tourist attractions in Barrow-in-Furness